The Great Ejection followed the Act of Uniformity 1662 in England. Several thousand Puritan ministers were forced out of their positions in the Church of England, following The Restoration of Charles II. It was a consequence (not necessarily intended) of the Savoy Conference of 1661.

History
The Act of Uniformity prescribed that any minister who refused to conform to the 1662 Book of Common Prayer by St Bartholomew's Day (24 August) 1662 should be ejected from the Church of England.  This date became known as "Black Bartholomew's Day" among Dissenters, a reference to the fact that it occurred on the same day as the St Bartholomew's Day massacre of 1572. Oliver Heywood estimated the number of ministers ejected at 2,500. This group included Richard Baxter, Edmund Calamy the Elder, Simeon Ashe, Thomas Case, John Flavel, William Jenkyn, Joseph Caryl, Benjamin Needler, Thomas Brooks, Thomas Manton, William Sclater, Thomas Doolittle and Thomas Watson. Biographical details of ejected ministers and their fates were later collected by the historian Edmund Calamy, grandson of the elder Calamy.

Although there had already been ministers outside the established church, the Great Ejection created an abiding concept of non-conformity. Strict religious tests of the Clarendon Code and other Penal Laws left a substantial section of English society excluded from public affairs, and also university degrees, for a century and a half. Culturally, in England and Wales, nonconformism endured longer than that.

Historiography

The bicentennial in 1862 led to a sharp debate, with the nonconformist agenda being questioned, and the account in Calamy being reviewed.

Iain Murray argues that the issue was deeper than "phrases in the Book of Common Prayer and forms of church order," but regarded the "nature of true Christianity."

Legacy
The Bishop of Liverpool, J. C. Ryle (1816–1900), referred to the Ejection as an "injury to the cause of true religion in England which will probably never be repaired".

A Service of Reconciliation was held at Westminster Abbey on 7 February 2012 to mark the 350th anniversary of the Great Ejection. Rowan Williams, then Archbishop of Canterbury, preached at the service which was attended by clergy and laity of the Church of England and the United Reformed Church.

See also
History of the Puritans from 1649
Dissenting academies
English Presbyterianism
:Category:Ejected English ministers of 1662

References

Further reading

. See pages 191 to 392 for an annotated index containing the name of every person and place recorded in the manuscript. The index entry for each person contains a biography (written in the early 20th century) which, with the exception of a few very well known individuals, records much of what is known about the person.
 

 
1662 in England
Puritanism in England
Political and cultural purges
1662 in Christianity
Savoy Conference
The Restoration